Swallows and Amazons is a 1963 BBC children's television series based on the 1930 novel of the same name by Arthur Ransome, about the holiday adventures of two groups of children, the Swallows (Walkers) and the Amazons (Blacketts), sailing on a lake and camping on an island in the Lake District in the 1930s.

The series of 6 episodes was shot on location on Coniston Water. Arthur Ransome, who lived nearby at Nibthwaite, was not impressed:
They began by proposing to blow up some of the rocks in the Peel Island harbour, and went on from there. According to Arthur their child-actors were ugly, their Captain Flint was 'common', their script a travesty of his book, their rural characters were made to talk Cockney, and they introduced some Cockney villains. Genia (his wife, who was always discouraging about his books when he was writing them) missed no chance of telling him he was a fool ever to have consented to the project, and he sadly agreed with her.

Characters
John Paul as Captain Flint
David Lott as John Walker
Siobhan Taylor as Susan Walker 
Susan George as Kitty (renamed from Titty)
Shane Younger as Roger Walker 
Mandy Harper (also known as Amanda Coxall or Mandy Dunn) as Nancy Blackett
Paula Boyd as Peggy Blackett
Mary Kenton as Mrs Walker
Ruth Kettlewell as Mrs Jackson 
Bernard Kay as Sammy the Policeman 
Sam Kydd as Young Billie, a charcoal-burner
Michael Ripper as Old Billie, a charcoal-burner 
George Roderick as Sam Packer, a burglar 
Anthony Sagar as Ernie Kidd, a burglar

The director was Peter Saunders and the music was composed by Alfred Elms.

References

External links

Media Vault about Pauline Marshall with video clips from TV series

1960s British children's television series
TV series
1963 British television series debuts
1963 British television series endings
British children's television series
BBC children's television shows
Television series set in the 1930s
Television shows set in the Lake District
Television shows filmed in the United Kingdom
Television series based on novels
Television shows based on British novels